The Jackson–Vicksburg–Brookhaven, MS Combined Statistical Area is made up of eight counties in central Mississippi and consists of the Jackson Metropolitan Statistical Area, the Brookhaven, MS Micropolitan Statistical Area, the Vicksburg micropolitan area, and the Yazoo City Micropolitan Statistical Area. The 2010 census placed the Jackson–Vicksburg–Brookhaven CSA population at 650,764, although as of 2019, it's estimated to have increased to 666,318.

Counties
 Copiah
 Hinds
 Madison
 Rankin
 Simpson
 Yazoo
 Warren
 Claiborne
 Lincoln

Communities

Places with more than 25,000 inhabitants
 Jackson (Principal City)
 Brandon
 Clinton
 Madison
 Pearl

Places with 10,000 to 25,000 inhabitants
 Brookhaven (Principal City)
 Byram
 Canton
 Flowood
 Ridgeland
 Vicksburg (Principal City)
 Yazoo City (Principal City)

Places with 1,000 to 10,000 inhabitants
 Crystal Springs
 Edwards
 Flora
 Florence
 Gluckstadt
 Hazlehurst
 Magee
 Mendenhall
 Pelahatchie
 Raymond
 Richland
 Terry
 Wesson

Places with less than 1,000 inhabitants
 Beauregard
 Bentonia
 Bolton
 Braxton
 D'Lo
 Eden
 Georgetown
 Learned
 Puckett
 Satartia
 Utica

Unincorporated places

Demographics
As of the census of 2000, there were 525,346 people, 189,734 households, and 134,348 families residing within the CSA. The racial makeup of the CSA was 52.57% White, 45.75% African American, 0.13% Native American, 0.65% Asian, 0.01% Pacific Islander, 0.28% from other races, and 0.59% from two or more races. Hispanic or Latino of any race were 1.17% of the population.

The median income for a household in the CSA was $34,234, and the median income for a family was $40,613. Males had a median income of $32,167 versus $23,316 for females. The per capita income for the CSA was $16,580.

See also

 Mississippi census statistical areas
 List of metropolitan areas in Mississippi
 List of micropolitan areas in Mississippi
 List of cities in Mississippi
 List of towns and villages in Mississippi
 List of census-designated places in Mississippi
 List of United States metropolitan areas

References

Metropolitan areas of Mississippi

Geography of Hinds County, Mississippi
Geography of Rankin County, Mississippi
Geography of Copiah County, Mississippi
Geography of Simpson County, Mississippi
Geography of Madison County, Mississippi
Geography of Yazoo County, Mississippi
Combined statistical areas of the United States